Richard Christopher Harrison (born 1979) is an American record producer and songwriter from Washington, D.C., specializing in R&B and hip hop music.

The winner of a Grammy Award, Harrison is well known for producing songs such as "Get Right" (performed by Jennifer Lopez), "1 Thing" (performed by Amerie) and "Crazy in Love" (performed by Beyoncé and Jay-Z). Harrison is the founder of Richcraft Entertainment, a label that housed artists such as singer Amerie, R&B girl group RichGirl, and rapper Young Steff.

Early life and education
A classically trained pianist and trumpet player, from an early age Harrison demonstrated the ability to play music he heard on the radio, later attending Howard University in Washington, D.C., majoring in history and hip-hop music.

Career
Harrison's first big music deal came in 1999 when Harrison worked with Mary J. Blige on "Beautiful Ones" for her album Mary. In 2001, he created his own production company, Richcraft Inc., and immediately wrote and produced Amerie's debut album, All I Have. In 2004 he won a Grammy Award for Beyoncé's "Crazy in Love", and a nomination for his work on Usher's Confessions album.

Harrison was back in the spotlight early in 2005 to work with Amerie, and produced Amerie's "1 Thing", from her album Touch, known for its infectious breakbeats and Amerie's unconventional vocals. A similar beat was used by Harrison for Toni Braxton's "Take This Ring" from her 2005 album Libra both tracks include elements of go-go (mainly in the strong, funky drumming with added percussion). In 2005, The New York Times called him "one of R&B's most exciting producers."

Harrison is currently involved in projects with 50 Cent, Tweet, Missy Elliott, Eve, Brandy, Young Steff and Dawn Robinson. Harrison has worked with Janet Jackson, Usher, Alicia Keys and Jennifer Lopez, and is still assisting the South Korean pop singer Se7en with his first American album, assisted by his producer Lionell Davis.

Harrison has been approached by many artists to assist with album productions, but it appears he is now focusing his time on his own artists, such as Young Steff and girl group RichGirl. There is a possibility that he may be appearing on Toni Braxton's forthcoming album.

Other works include tracks for Claudette Ortiz's solo album, 3LW's latest and as yet unreleased album and tracks that may appear on 50 Cent's next album.

Production discography

1999
Mary J. Blige – Mary
 04. "Beautiful Ones"

2001
Mary J. Blige – No More Drama
 15. "In the Meantime", producer

2002
Amerie – All I Have, producer and songwriter
 01. "Why Don't We Fall in Love"
 02. "Talkin' to Me"
 03. "Nothing Like Loving You"
 04. "Can't Let Go"
 05. "Need You Tonight"
 06. "Got to Be There"
 07. "I Just Died"
 08. "Hatin' On You"
 09. "Float"
 10. "Show Me"
 11. "All I Have"
 12. "Outro"
 13. "Just What I Needed to See" (Japanese bonus track)
 14. "Why Don't We Fall in Love" (Remix) (featuring Ludacris) (Japanese bonus track)
 15. "Why Don't We Fall in Love (Richcraft Remix)" (Japanese bonus track)

Kelly Rowland – Simply Deep 
 04. "Can't Nobody"

2003
Tha' Rayne – Reign Supreme
 02. "Didn't You Know"

Beyoncé – Dangerously in Love
 01. "Crazy in Love" (featuring Jay Z)
 
 05. "Be with You"

2004
Usher – Confessions
 11. "Take Your Hand"
 

Destiny's Child – Destiny Fulfilled
 02. "Soldier" (featuring T.I. and Lil Wayne)

2005
Jennifer Lopez – Rebirth
 01. "Get Right"
 
 04. "Whatever You Wanna Do"
 

Christina Milian – Be Cool soundtrack
 08. "Ain't No Reason"

Amerie – Touch
 01. "1 Thing"
 02. "All I Need"
 05. "Like It Used to Be"
 06. "Talkin' About"
 07. "Come with Me"
 08. "Rolling Down My Face"
 13. "Why Don't We Fall in Love" (Richcraft Remix)

Missy Elliott – The Cookbook 
 10. "Can't Stop"

Pussycat Dolls – PCD
 06. "I Don't Need a Man"

Toni Braxton – Libra 
 04. "Take This Ring"

2006
Christina Milian – So Amazin'
 11. "Wind You Up"

Christina Aguilera – Back to Basics
 02. "Makes Me Wanna Pray" (featuring Steve Winwood)
 

Beyoncé – B'Day
 03. "Suga Mama"
 
 07. "Freakum Dress"
 11. "Creole" (Japanese bonus track)

Diddy – Press Play
 18. "Making It Hard" (featuring Mary J. Blige)

Mos Def – Tru3 Magic 
 02. "Undeniable"

2007
Che'Nelle – Things Happen for a Reason
 10. "Summer Jam”

2008
Jean Grae – Jeanius
 15. "That's What's Up Now" (Bonus track)

2011
Marsha Ambrosius – Late Nights & Early Mornings
 03. "Late Nights & Early Mornings"
 

Jennifer Hudson – I Remember Me
 01. "No One Gonna Love You"

Eric Roberson – Mister Nice Guy
 01. "Mister Nice Guy"

RichGirl – RichGirl
 "24's"
 "Itty Bitty"
 "He Ain't Wit Me Now (Tho)"

RichGirl – Fall in Love with RichGirl
 02. "Smile & Wave" (featuring Chris Brown)
 04. "Circles"

2016
Amerie - Drive
06. "Out Loud"

2020
Tiffany Haddish
 "Too Much"
 "Do Our Thing (featuring Snoop Dogg)"

Unreleased
3LW
 "Do Ya"
 "Got Me On Lock"
 "Up to You"
 "No Matter What"
 "Senses"

Amerie
 "Love's Off the Chain"

Cynthia Lissette
 "Don't Wanna Go"
 "What U Say"

Gwen Stefani
 "Parental Advisory"

Janet Jackson
 "Clap Your Hands"
 "Pops Up"
 "Speed It Up (Put It On Me)"
 "What Can I Say"

Mary J. Blige
 "Outta My Head"

Natasha Ramos
 "Here I Am"

RichGirl
 "Pimp Cup" (featuring Snoop Dogg)
 "Foolish"
 "Treasures"
 "Blowin' Up Phones"
 "Millionaire"

Se7en
 "This is My Year" (featuring Fabolous)

Usher
 "Dat Girl Right There" (featuring Ludacris)
 "Ride"
 "Whatever I Want" (featuring Mike Jones)
 "I Did It" (featuring RichGirl)

Young Steff
 "Dat Gurl Right"
 "Don't Trip"
 "Feeling Myself" (featuring Brave)
 "Put That On Everything"

References

External links
Rich Harrison at MySpace
Richgirl at Myspace

1979 births
African-American record producers
African-American songwriters
American funk keyboardists
American hip hop record producers
American male songwriters
Place of birth missing (living people)
Grammy Award winners
Howard University alumni
Living people
Songwriters from Washington, D.C.
Record producers from Washington, D.C.
21st-century African-American people
20th-century African-American people